Shorter may refer to:

As a place name
 Shorter, Alabama, a town located in Macon County, Alabama, United States

As a surname
 Alan Shorter (1932–1988), American jazz trumpeter and flugelhorn player
 Brian Shorter (born 1968), American former basketball player
 Clement Shorter (1857–1926), English journalist
 Clinton Shorter (born 1971), Canadian film and television composer
 Dora Sigerson Shorter (1866–1918), Irish poet and sculptor
 Edward Shorter (1767–1836), British inventor
 Eli Sims Shorter (1823–1879), American politician
 Frank Shorter (born 1947), American athlete
 Jim Shorter (1938–2000), American football player
 John Gill Shorter (1818–1872), American politician
 Ken Shorter (born 1945), Australian actor
 Laurence Shorter (born 1970), American author and comedian
 Richard Shorter (1906–1984), English cricketer
 Rick Shorter (1934–2017), American musician and record producer
 Shannon Shorter (born 1989), American basketball player 
 Stuart Shorter, disabled homeless man from Cambridge, England, about whom the biography "Stuart: A Life Backwards" was written
 Susie Lankford Shorter (1859–1912), American educator 
 Wayne Shorter (1933–2023), American jazz saxophonist and composer

Other uses
 The comparative form of short
 Shorter University, an American four year, co-educational college located in Rome, Georgia, United States
 Shorter Oxford English Dictionary, a two-volume, scaled-down version of the Oxford English Dictionary
 Westminster Shorter Catechism or "Shorter Catechism", a set of three Christian religious texts dating from the 1640s